The South Boston Boat Clubs Historic District is a historic district consisting of clubhouse buildings at 1793–1849 William J. Day Boulevard in the South Boston neighborhood of Boston, Massachusetts.  The district includes four late-Victorian era clubhouses, which were built on "made land" created by filling in mudflats from nearby construction projects.  The oldest of the buildings, that of the Boston Harbor Yacht Club, was built in 1898, but may contain elements as old as 1870, when the Boston Yacht Club was founded.

The district listed on the National Register of Historic Places in 2005.

See also
National Register of Historic Places listings in southern Boston, Massachusetts

References

Historic districts in Suffolk County, Massachusetts
South Boston
National Register of Historic Places in Boston
Historic districts on the National Register of Historic Places in Massachusetts